Anthrocon (abbreviated AC) is a furry convention that takes place in Pittsburgh, Pennsylvania each June or July. Its caters to the furries: fans of fictional anthropomorphic animal characters in art and literature. The convention was first held in 1997 in Albany, New York, and moved multiple times before settling at the David L. Lawrence Convention Center. Since moving to Pittsburgh in 2006, the convention has drawn millions in financing to the local economy.

In 2022 Anthrocon drew about 10,000 attendees, and is currently one of the largest furry conventions in the world.

Background and history
Anthrocon was founded in 1997 as Albany Anthrocon (AAC) in New York State, with a membership of about 500. The convention was renamed to 'Anthrocon' and moved to Valley Forge, Pennsylvania in 1999 and 2000; then to a larger hotel, the Adam's Mark, on the outskirts of Philadelphia in 2001. Attendance grew each year, Anthrocon becoming the largest furry convention in 2001 with an attendance of 1,457. In 2004 it had climbed to 2,404 attendees in its final year at the Adam's Mark.

Due to the unforeseen sale of the Adam's Mark Hotel in November 2004, Anthrocon chose the Wyndham Franklin Plaza in Philadelphia as the site for its 2005 convention. Attendance that year dropped to 2,373. In June 2005, a contract with the Westin Convention Center Hotel in Pittsburgh was signed, and Anthrocon was scheduled to be held at the adjoining David L. Lawrence Convention Center between June 15 and 18, 2006. Despite concerns that the move to Pittsburgh would decrease attendance, it rose to 2,489, enough to ensure the future of the convention in Pittsburgh.

In 2007 Anthrocon was featured in the Guinness World Records (2008 Edition) as the "largest furry fan club" in the world. In 2008, Anthrocon became the first furry convention to have an attendance exceeding 3,000 members, the official count reaching 3,390. In 2009, attendance rose 11% to 3,776, and the Fursuit Parade count jumped to 640—a 41% increase. Anthrocon 2009 brought approximately $3 million to the Pittsburgh economy.

Anthrocon 2010 had an attendance of 4,238, the first furry convention to exceed 4,000 members; and by 2012 saw 5,179 attendees, with a Fursuit Parade exceeding 1,000. The admission price was also set overall at $60 for a four-day pass, though pre-registered attendees paid $50. In 2013, Anthrocon contracted roomspace with seven of Pittsburgh's ten downtown hotels.

In 2017, Anthrocon lost the title of "World's most attended furry convention", as Midwest FurFest in Rosemont, Illinois claimed the title with an attendance of over 8,700.

The chairman of the convention since 1999, Dr. Samuel Conway (nicknamed "Kagemushi" or "Uncle Kage" among attendees), oversees the operations of Anthrocon, with the help of convention staff and volunteers who donate their time and energy throughout the weekend to assist the multitude of small tasks which arise. Since 1997, Anthrocon has raised more than $200,000 for animal-related charities.

Fernando's Café 

Since the convention's presence in Pittsburgh, Fernando's Café, a fast food restaurant located near the Westin Convention Center, is one of many restaurants that cater to furries during Anthrocon weekend. However, in 2012, Fernando DeCarvalho, the owner of the restaurant, called Conway informing him that he had gone into debt as a result of the Great Recession. In response, Conway initiated a fundraising campaign which resulted in the restaurant receiving $20,000, a move the Huffington Post says would "alleviate some of [DeCarvalho's] debt and allow him to keep his doors open long enough for one last Anthrocon."

Typical programming and events
There are areas open most of the day to accommodate sales by Dealers and Artists as well as an area to congregate and socialize.

Anthrocon provides a number of specialized 'tracks' of programming with similar furry based themes and scheduled 'events'.

The programming tracks involve discussions and work groups focused on the application of furry in Art, Comedy and Improv, Computer Gaming, Costuming (Fursuits), Music, Puppetry, Role-Playing (both gaming and real-life), and Writing.

Scheduled events that take place have included a Charity Auction, Masquerade, Fursuit Parade, nightly dances, Art Show Auctions, and special presentations by Uncle Kage and "2 the Ranting Gryphon".

Every year the convention has several Guests of Honor – prominent individuals who are compensated for their attendance and travel expenses. Past Guests of Honor at Anthrocon have included Rob Paulsen and Mark Evanier.

Anthrocon by year
This table includes the locations of each convention as well as attendance figures, charity donations, convention themes, and guests of honor by year.

Gallery

References

External links

 
 Anthrocon at WikiFur

Conventions in Pennsylvania
Furry conventions
Recurring events established in 1997